The 2013 NCAA National Collegiate Women's Ice Hockey Tournament involved eight schools in single-elimination play that determined the national champion of women's NCAA Division I college ice hockey. Regional quarterfinals were contested on March 15 and 16, 2013. The Frozen Four was played on March 22 and 24, 2013 at Ridder Arena in Minneapolis, with the University of Minnesota as the host school.

The University of Minnesota won the title with a 6–3 win over Boston University, becoming the first NCAA women's hockey team ever to complete a perfect season (41–0–0).

Bracket

Quarterfinals held at home sites of seeded teams

Note: * denotes overtime period(s)

All-Tournament team

G Noora Raty, Minnesota
F Marie-Philip Poulin, Boston University
F Amanda Kessel, Minnesota
F Hannah Brandt, Minnesota
D Milica McMillen, Minnesota
D Megan Bozek, Minnesota

See also
2013 NCAA Division I Men's Ice Hockey Tournament

References

NCAA Women's Ice Hockey Tournament

2013 in sports in Minnesota